Bhasma may refer to:
Vibhuti, sacred ash made of dried wood used in Hindu, Vedic and Āgamic rituals
 Bhasma, a more general term for any ash product in Ayurveda